Talovka is a rural locality (a selo) in Zhuravlikhinsky Selsoviet, Pervomaysky District, Altai Krai, Russia. The population was 100 as of 2013. There are 5 streets.

Geography 
Talovka is located 55 km northeast of Novoaltaysk (the district's administrative centre) by road. Novopovalikha is the nearest rural locality.

References 

Rural localities in Pervomaysky District, Altai Krai